"À la claire fontaine" is a traditional French song, which has also become very popular in Belgium and in Canada, particularly in Quebec and the Maritime provinces of New Brunswick, Nova Scotia, and Prince Edward Island.

History
The song may have appeared as early as 1604 when the first permanent French settlement was established in the Maritimes. As with all traditional songs, numerous versions of both music and lyrics can be found, and versions known in France and Belgium vary from those known in Canada.

Musicality
The melody is pentatonic, and uses only four notes of the scale. The verse employs an alternating 7- and 6-syllable, with the refrain adding an extra syllable to each line.

Meaning
Like another famous children's song, "Au clair de la lune", it has an adult theme - in this case, one of lost love.  The song speaks of a lover bathing in a fountain, hearing a nightingale singing, and thinking about her lover whom she lost long ago after failing to give him a rosebud. The nightingale's heart laughs but hers weeps. The rosebud is a euphemism for maidenhood, and thus she wishes it were still intact and could still be given to him.

The refrain is repeated at the end of each verse:
"Il y a longtemps que je t'aime, Jamais je ne t'oublierai."
"I've loved you for a long time, I will never forget you."

The song also has a hidden political meaning of resistance against British invasion of Quebec, and it was sung by the Québécois as a sign of resistance: the Rose representing the British, the clear fountain representing the Saint Laurent River, and the sentence "I've loved you for a long time, I will never forget you" is intended for France and the French land of Quebec. (Or so it is commonly said, but it is not clear how the rose can both represent the British and be something the Québécois refused to give to France, thereby losing its love.)

Complete lyrics

The lyrics are:

Modern usage
The song can be heard at the end of the 2006 film The Painted Veil, sung by a children's choir.

It inspired the title of the 2008 French film Il y a longtemps que je t'aime and appears as a recurring theme.

It has been performed by Dame Emma Albani and Nana Mouskouri, among others. Kate & Anna McGarrigle, who regularly sang it as an encore in their live performances and released such a recording on their compilation album ODDiTTiES.

It has been adapted and arranged, notably a choral arrangement by the French composer Jean Langlais, and a jazz version by the English arranger Bob Chilcott.

It was sung by Henri (Andrew Moodie), Thomas Durant's butler, in "Jamais Je Ne T'oublierai - Episode 4", Season 1 of AMC's Hell On Wheels.

Michael Tippett inscribed his String Quartet No. 5 (1990-1) with a verse from the folk song. It lends the quartet a symbolic significance and adds a strong conceptual dimension to the composition.

In a poignant moment at the end of the French film Things to Come (L'Avenir) by Mia Hansen-Løve, 2016, the character Nathalie, played by Isabelle Huppert, sings the song to her granddaughter to comfort her.

Before being approached by a bounty hunter, Rivard can be seen humming the tune in the first episode of Frontier (Netflix) Season 2.

During the Netflix documentary film Icarus, that tells the story of the Russian athletics doping scandal, a rendition of the song sung by artist Genevoise is used to illustrate the heartache felt by Grigory Rodchenkov after he says goodbye to his wife and prepares to enter the United States Federal Witness Protection Program.

In Louis Malle's 1987 film Au Revoir Les Enfants, on their way to the public baths, the main character's group sings the song.

In Sid Meier's Civilization VI, the song is used as an ambient theme for the Canadian civilization in the expansion pack, Sid Meier's Civilization VI: Gathering Storm.

A version of the song is used in Episode 4 of the Netflix Docuseries, The Devil Next Door.

An excerpt of the song is used in Season 3 Ep. 8 of the Netflix show, Shadowhunters: The Mortal Instruments.

There is a recording by Eva Gauthier available through the United States Library of Congress.

The song was used during the Québec ceremony for the Day of national remembrance of the victims of COVID-19, on March 11, 2021. It was sung by the choral group Les Petits Chanteurs de Beauport.

References

French folk songs
Year of song unknown
Songwriter unknown